Moses Edwin Clapp (May 21, 1851March 6, 1929) was an American lawyer and politician.

Biography
Born in Delphi, Indiana, Clapp moved with his parents to Hudson, Wisconsin. He went to University of Wisconsin Law School and practiced law in Hudson, Wisconsin. He was district attorney for St. Croix County, Wisconsin. He then moved to Fergus Falls, Minnesota, where he practiced law.

He served as the Minnesota Attorney General from 1887 until 1893. In 1900, he entered the special election for Minnesota's seat in the United States Senate that was made vacant by the death of Cushman Davis. He won that election, and was later reelected in 1904 and 1910 for two additional terms. He served in the Senate from January 28, 1901, to March 3, 1917, a term that spanned the 57th, 58th, 59th, 60th, 61st, 62nd, 63rd, and 64th Congresses. He was not renominated by the party in 1916. Clapp, along with Hiram F. Stevens, Ambrose Tighe, Thomas D. O'Brien, and Clarence Halbert, was also a co-founder of William Mitchell College of Law.

References

External links

 
 

1851 births
1929 deaths
People from Delphi, Indiana
Republican Party United States senators from Minnesota
Minnesota Attorneys General
Minnesota lawyers
Wisconsin lawyers
People from Fergus Falls, Minnesota
People from Hudson, Wisconsin
19th-century American lawyers
University of Wisconsin Law School alumni